The 2016 Asian Women's Club Volleyball Championship was the 17th staging of the AVC Club Championships which was hosted by the Philippines. The tournament was held at the Alonte Sports Arena in Biñan, Laguna. It was  held from September 3 to September 11, 2016.

The tournament was organized by the Philippine Super Liga and the Larong Volleyball sa Pilipinas, Inc. The tournament serves as the 2nd Asian tournament which was hosted by the LVPI following the Asian Under-23 Championships hosting in 2015.

Pools composition 
The drawing of lots of the teams, which determined the composition of the pools for the Asian Women's Club Championship, was conducted on April 27, 2016 at the Foton Quezon Avenue showroom in Quezon City.
The Philippines as host chose their representatives to be grouped in Pool A. They also chose Vietnam to be in this group.

* Withdrew

Squads

Pool standing procedure
The following procedures shall be followed to determine the ranking of teams in a pool:

 Number of matches won
 Match points
 Sets ratio
 Points ratio
 Result of the last match between the tied teams

Match won 3–0 or 3–1: 3 match points for the winner, 0 match points for the loser
Match won 3–2: 2 match points for the winner, 1 match point for the loser

Preliminary round

All times are in Philippine Standard Time (UTC+08:00).

Pool A

|}

|}

Pool B

|}

|}

Pool C

|}

|}

Pool D

|}

|}

Classification 9th-12th

Pool G

|}

|}

Pool H

|}

|}

11th place

|}

9th place

|}

Classification 1st-8th
All times are in Philippine Standard Time (UTC+08:00).

Pool E

|}

|}

Pool F

|}

|}

Final round

Quarterfinals

}

|}

5th-8th Semifinals

|}

Semifinals

|}

7th place

|}

5th place

|}

3rd place

|}

Final

|}

Final standing

Awards

Most Valuable Player
 Sarina Koga (NEC Red Rockets)

Best Setter
 Pornpun Guedpard (Bangkok Glass)

Best Outside Spikers
 Wilavan Apinyapong (Bangkok Glass)
 Liu Yanhan (Ba'yi Shenzhen)

Best Middle Blockers
 Kana Ono (NEC Red Rockets)
 Pleumjit Thinkaow (Bangkok Glass)

Best Opposite Spiker
 Mizuki Yanagita (NEC Red Rockets)

Best Libero
 Tikamporn Changkeaw (Bangkok Glass)

References

External links
2016 Asian Women's Club Volleyball Championship at Philippine Superliga

2016 Asian Women's Club Volleyball Championship
ASian
Asian
International volleyball competitions hosted by the Philippines